Herbert Adams (1874–1958) was an English writer of fifty 'cosy' mystery novels, 28 featuring the detective Roger Bennion, a golfer and amateur sleuth whose cases are often set in or around golfing competitions; and 9 feature Jimmie Haswell, a London lawyer. He also wrote short stories, humorous verse and two other mystery novels under the pseudonym Jonathan Gray.

As 'Jonathan Gray'
'Safety Last' (1934)
'The Owl' (1937)

As Herbert Adams

Jimmie Haswell Novels
'The Secret of Bogey House' (1924)
'The Crooked Lip' (1926)
'The Queen's Gate Mystery' (1927)
'The Empty Bed'(1928)
'Rogues Fall Out'(1928)
'The Golden Ape' (1930)
'The Crime in the Dutch Garden' (1931)
'The Paulton Plot' (1932)
'The Woman in Black' (1933)

Roger Bennion Novels
'Death Off the Fairway' (1936)
'The Old Jew Mystery' (1936)
'A Single Hair' (1937)
'The Bluff' (1938)
'The Damned Spot' (1938)
'Black Death' (1939)
'The Nineteenth Hole Mystery' (1939)
'The Case of the Stolen Bridegroom' (1940)
'The Chief Witness' (1940)
'Stab in the Back' (1941)
'Roger Bennion's Double' (1941)
'The Araway Oath' (1942)
'Signal for Invasion' (1942)
'Victory Song' (1943)
'Four Winds' (1944)
'The Writing on the Wall' (1945)
'Diamonds Are Trumps' (1947)
'Crime Wave at Little Cornford' (1948)
'One to Play' (1949)
'The Dean's Daughters' (1950)
'The Sleeping Draught' (1951)
'Exit the Skeleton' (1952)
'The Spectre in Brown' (1953)
'Slippery Dick' (1954)
'The Judas Kiss' (1955)
'Welcome Home!' (1956)
'Death on the First Tee' (1957)
'Death of a Viewer' (1958)

Non-Series Novels
'A Virtue of Necessity' (1900)
'By Order of the Five' (1925)
'The Sloane Square Mystery' (1925)
'Comrade Jill' (1926)
'The Perfect Round' (1927). Short stories	 
'Caroline Ormesby's Crime' (1930). Serialised: Birmingham Daily Gazette, 'Caroline Hits Back' (1930)
'Oddways' (1930)
'A Lady So Innocent' (1932)
'John Brand's Will' (1933). US Title: The Golf House Murder
'The Knife' (1934). US Title: The Strange Murder of Hatton, K.C.	 
'Mystery and Minette' (1934)
'The Body in the Bunker' (1935)
'Fate Laughs' (1935)
'A Word of Six Letters' (1936). US Title: Murder Without Risk	
'The Lovely Lucinda'. Serialised: Weekly Telegraph (1937) 
'The Scarlet Feather' (1943)
'Murder Most Just' (1956)

Short stories
'A Lady-Killer'. Young Man, 21 July 1900
'A Child of Cheshire'. Young Woman, 5 October 1900
'A Consignment from Yarmouth'. Beverley & East Riding Recorder, 3 August 1907
'TITLE UNKNOWN'. Weekly Telegraph Christmas Annual (1931)

External links 
Some of Adams's novels can be found at Project Gutenberg Australia.
More about Adam's novels at Fantastic Fiction
Another Bibliography Class Crime Fiction

1874 births
1958 deaths
English crime fiction writers
English mystery writers